Malcolm Arnold Academy is a mixed-gender Academy in Northampton, England, for pupils aged 11 – 18.  It was established in 2010 following the closure of the Unity College in July of that year, and opened for year 7 and  ages 16+ on 3 September 2010, and for other years on 6 September. The academy, which begins as an entirely new school, occupies the campus of the former Unity College and has the capacity for 1,450 pupils. The academy is a Church of England foundation academy but caters for all faiths and none.
In February 2014 it was announced that the academy would be forming a Post-16 Football Scholarship scheme with local semi-professional club AFC Rushden & Diamonds.
The academy has had four Principals. Mr Philip Cantwell was the first Principal and Mr Chris Steed, was Executive Principal 2014-2019. These were followed by Executive Principal is Mrs Helena Brothwell and Kimberley Lawton is Interim Principal. Mrs Megan Morris took over during the COVID-19 pandemic and is still currently still in charge

Creation
The academy was established following an announcement on 12 May 2010 by Northamptonshire County Council that Northampton's Unity College was to be closed following continued poor performance reported by Ofsted. It was further announced that a new school would be opened under the leadership of the David Ross Education Trust, which proposed that the new academy would specialise in mathematics and music. In addition to these specialist subjects, the academy would offer students a broad and balanced academic and vocational curriculum. David Ross, chairman of the foundation, said: “Closing a school is never an easy decision, however we believe it is in the best interests of students, staff, parents and the wider community to open a new academy that will offer a world-class education." The David Ross Foundation also sponsors the Havelock Academy in Grimsby, which opened in 2007. The new school  is being  funded by the Department of Education, Philip Cantwell, the first principal of the new academy, was previously the headmaster of The King's School, Tynemouth.

The academy, a specialist maths and music college, is named after Sir Malcolm Arnold, the English composer, who is best remembered for his nine symphonies and also wrote the scores for many films including The Bridge on the River Kwai, Whistle Down the Wind, Hobson's Choice, and The Inn of the Sixth Happiness. Sir Malcolm, who was born in Northampton, died in 2006 aged 84.

Admission
Admission is granted primarily to members of the Church of England fed by the link schools of All Saints CEVA Primary School, Collingtree CEVA Primary School, St Andrew’s CEVA Primary School, St James’ CEVA Primary School, St Luke’s CEVA Primary School, Weston Favell CEVA Primary School, or any other church that is a member of Churches Together in England, followed by members of a religion affiliated to the British Interfaith Network. and pupils must reside within the areas governed by the Borough of Northampton.

Controversy 
In the 2018 OFSTED report the executive Principal, Chris Steed was described as highly effective. Mr Steed secured a promotion and was replaced by his deputy in March 2019, Nicola Koncarevic.   A statement said the following 'you will be aware that Mrs Koncarevic has recently resigned as Principal of Malcolm Arnold Academy. We would like to thank Nicola for her hard work over the last 5 years and for the dedication she has shown to the pupils, staff and community in the various roles she held within Malcolm Arnold. We wish her all the very best for the future.'

In September 2019 new routines were put in place as part of a warm-strict approach. This was followed by some controversy after the school withdrew students from taking part in an annual national inter-academy DRET sporting competition. A school spokesman said: “As part of the David Ross Education Trust, we are fortunate to be invited to take part in a number of major national events every year – these are all generously funded by the David Ross Foundation.

"This year, however, students from Malcolm Arnold Academy did not take part in the Winter Cup because behavior has not been good enough.

“We make no apology for having high expectations of how pupils should behave, and if they fall short there are consequences.

"Subject to there being improvements over the coming terms, we very much hope that the academy will be able to attend the Summer Cup and represent ourselves with pride among all the other academies in the David Ross Education Trust.”

No details were given on the bad behavior, but an anonymous parent suggested a couple of students were allegedly disrespectful to David Ross on a recent school visit.

References 

Academies in West Northamptonshire District
Church of England secondary schools in the Diocese of Peterborough
Secondary schools in West Northamptonshire District
Educational institutions established in 2010
2010 establishments in England